Tiberiy Tiberiyovich Korponai (15 July 1958 – 5 January 2021) was a Soviet–Ukrainian football defender.

He had two younger brothers Adalbert and Ivan together with whom he used to play for FC Kremin Kremenchuk.

References
 Career summary by Footballfacts

1958 births
2021 deaths
People from Buy, Kostroma Oblast
Russian emigrants to Ukraine
Russian people of Ukrainian descent
Soviet footballers
Association football forwards
Ukrainian footballers
FC Karpaty Lviv players
FC Volyn Lutsk players
FC Kremin Kremenchuk players
Ukrainian Premier League managers
FC Kremin Kremenchuk managers
Ukrainian football managers